"Domino Dancing" is a song by English synth-pop duo Pet Shop Boys, released as the lead single from their third studio album, Introspective (1988). It reached number seven on the UK Singles Chart and topped the charts in Finland and Spain.

Background
Written by Chris Lowe and Neil Tennant, and influenced by Latin pop, the song was produced by Lewis A. Martinée, the Miami-based producer behind 1980s freestyle groups such as Exposé. The song was recorded at Martinée's studio in Miami, resulting in a considerably large number of studio musicians being featured on it for a Pet Shop Boys song.

The duo had achieved three number ones in 1987 and 1988, and Domino Dancing was expected to continue this success. However, the public reception to the duo's new Latin sound proved disappointing. Tennant remembers: "...it entered the charts at number nine and I thought, 'that's that, then – it's all over'. I knew then that our imperial phase of number one hits was over."

The single missed the top 10 on the Billboard Hot 100, peaking at number 18, and was the duo's sixth and, to date, last top-20 entry in the United States. (In fact, they have not made the top 60 since "Domino Dancing".) The song did reach number five on the Billboard Hot Dance Club Play chart, where the duo has seen more consistent success.

Critical reception
Pan-European magazine Music & Media wrote, "Their knack of creating irresistible synthesizer-driven pop songs never seems to diminish. Not their best, but still better than most of the competition."

Music video
The music video for "Domino Dancing" was directed by Eric Watson and was his sixth of eleven collaborations with the band. 

The storyline is about a love triangle between two handsome young men who are fighting over a beautiful woman. Rolling Stone magazine calls the video "probably the most homoerotic pop video ever made", citing the slow-motion shots of the boys wrestling on the beach:

The video was taped in about four days in the old colonial district of San Juan, Puerto Rico, in 1988. One of the locations that was featured in the music video is the Santa María Magdalena de Pazzis Cemetery.

All the lead actors were Puerto Rican; the two boys were David Boira and Adalberto Martinez Mojica and the girl was Donna Bottman, who was an aspiring actress and model. All of them were cast by the Pet Shop Boys.

Domino Dancing (extended version) is a seven-minute dance song, combined with Lowe's synth melodies, Cuban brass and hip hop beats.

Versions
 Domino Dancing (short video 7″) – 4:18
 Domino Dancing (extended version 12″ remix) – 7:41

Cast
 Chris Lowe as himself
 Neil Tennant as himself
 David Boira as Boy
 Adalberto Martinez Mojica as Boy
 Donna Bottman as Girl

Track listings
 7": Parlophone / R 6190 (UK)
 "Domino Dancing" – 4:17
 "Don Juan" – 3:53

 12": Parlophone / 12 R 6190 (UK)
 "Domino Dancing" (Disco mix) – 7:41
 "Don Juan" (Disco mix) – 7:32
 "Domino Dancing" (Alternative mix) – 4:42

* also released on MC (TCR 6190) and CD (CDR 6190)

 12": Parlophone / 12 RX 6190 (UK)
 "Domino Dancing" (Base mix) – 5:53
 "Don Juan" (Demo) – 4:19
 "Domino Dancing" (Instrumental demo) – 4:45

 12": EMI-Manhattan / V-56116 (US)
 "Domino Dancing" (Disco mix) – 7:41
 "Domino Dancing" (Single version) – 4:17
 "Don Juan" (Disco mix) – 7:32
 "Domino Dancing" (Alternative mix) – 4:48 (Longer outro)

Charts

Weekly charts

Year-end charts

Cover versions
The Swedish Pet Shop Boys tribute band West End Girls released a cover version of "Domino Dancing" in 2005 as a single from their album Goes Petshopping, peaking at number three on the Swedish Singles Chart.

References

1988 singles
1988 songs
Freestyle music songs
Latin pop songs
Number-one singles in Finland
Number-one singles in Spain
Parlophone singles
Pet Shop Boys songs
Songs written by Chris Lowe
Songs written by Neil Tennant
Works based on the Don Juan legend